This is a list of Olympic records in archery.

Men's records

Women's records

Mixed team record

References
general

 
 

https://worldarchery.sport/world-records

specific

Notes

Archery
List of records
Archery records